The BZK-005 high-altitude, long-range UAV is a reconnaissance aircraft designed by Beijing University of Aeronautics & Astronautics and Harbin Aircraft Industry (Group) Co., Ltd. It is used by the PLA Navy and PLA Air Force.

Development
The BZK-005 was unveiled in Zhuhai International Airshow 2006, where video and models were demonstrated to the public regarding this UAV.

Design
BZK-005 has a few stealth features integrated into its design. It is believed that a satellite data link antenna is held in its large upper body dome. Under the body there is an optic-electric sensor system which is believed to be its main sensor. It is expected that BZK-005 has cruising speed of around 170 km/h, service ceiling 8,000 m, max takeoff weight is around 1,200 kg, max payload over 150 kg.

Variants 
BZK-005: unarmed reconnaissance version.

BZK-005C: Developed from original BZK-005 and optimized aerodynamic structure and electronic system with attack and reconnaissance capability. It can equipped with booms or missiles with more than 300 kg payload. First revealed by Chinese state media on 11 November 2018.

Service history
The BZK-005 is in service with the People's Liberation Army Navy and People's Liberation Army Air Force. It may be known as "Sea Eagle" in PLAN service and "Giant Eagle" in PLAAF service.

In August 2011, a BZK-005 crashed into a farm field close to Xingtai, He Bei province. Photos of the wreckage were posted on various Chinese internet websites.

In April 2019, the BZK-005 was confirmed to be used by the Chinese military in conducting maritime surveillance over the East China Sea. The UAV was intercepted by the Japan Air Self-Defence Force in a scramble alert after violating Japanese air space.

In August 2021, the BZK-005 was spotted over the East China Sea alongside two Y-9s. It was speculated to be an upgraded variant, "specifically configured for wide-area intelligence, surveillance, and reconnaissance (ISR) missions with an undernose synthetic aperture radar (SAR) radome – possibly housing a Ku-band D3010 SAR system with a dual-mode SAR/ground moving target indicator (GMTI) capability – and a mid-mounted ventral electro-optical/infrared (EO/IR) turret."

Operators

People's Liberation Army Air Force: 84 units
People's Liberation Army Naval Air Force: 21 units

Specifications

See also

References

Unmanned military aircraft of China
2000s Chinese military aircraft
BZK-005
2010s Chinese military aircraft
People's Liberation Army Navy